Klara Andric (born 9 March 1981) is an Australian politician.

A member of the Labor Party, Andric has been a candidate for the party at the 2013 state election (Jandakot) and the 2014 Australian Senate special election in Western Australia. From 2017 to 2021, she was Labor's director of business roundtables.

At the 2021 state election, Andric was elected as a member of the Western Australian Legislative Council for South Metropolitan, with her term to commence on 22 May 2021.

References

1981 births
Living people
Australian Labor Party members of the Parliament of Western Australia
Members of the Western Australian Legislative Council
Women members of the Western Australian Legislative Council